Analogue Bubblebath IV (also titled "Analogue Bubblebath 4 Track EP") is an EP by Richard D. James under his alias AFX. It is the fourth release in the Analogue Bubblebath series.

The EP consists of four tracks (plus one hidden track on CD releases). It was released in 1994 on Rephlex Records in both CD and 12" vinyl formats.

All tracks are untitled. However, many AFX fans have titled the songs after animals whose noises are thought to be heard on each track – Elephant Song, Cuckoo, Gibbon, and Sloth, in order. These names have been adopted by the Gracenote music database. The fifth track of the CD reissue is actually a heavily modulated snippet from a press conference with Evel Knievel, sometime after the Snake River Canyon incident. It is often nicknamed "Knievel."

Track listing

Side one
 Elephant Song – 6:22
 Cuckoo – 5:08

Side two
 Gibbon – 6:04
 Sloth – 8:21

2003 CD reissue
 Elephant Song – 6:22
 Cuckoo – 6:04
 Gibbon – 5:08
 Sloth – 8:21
 Knievel – 0:27

Fans titled the tracks after sounds that are heard in the tracks.

External links
 More info, artwork and samples here
 Complete AFX discography

1994 EPs
Aphex Twin EPs
Rephlex Records EPs